North Macedonia competed at the 2020 Summer Paralympics in Tokyo, Japan, from 24 August to 5 September 2021. This was their seventh consecutive appearance at the Summer Paralympics since 1996.

Shooting

North Macedonia entered one athletes into the Paralympic competition. Olivera Nakovska-Bikova successfully break the Paralympic qualification at the 2018 WSPS World Championships which was held in Cheongju, South Korea.

See also 
 North Macedonia at the Paralympics
 North Macedonia at the 2020 Summer Olympics

References 

Nations at the 2020 Summer Paralympics
2020
2021 in North Macedonia sport